Radek Drulák (born 12 January 1962) is a Czech former football striker and later manager. He played 16 matches for the Czech Republic and scored six goals. He also participated at the UEFA Euro 1996, and won a silver medal.

Career
Drulák was born in Hulín.

Between December 1990 and June 1994, he had a spell abroad - playing his club football in Germany. During this time, he became the leading goal-scorer of the 2. Bundesliga while playing for VfB Oldenburg.

A striker, he was a top goalscorer in the Czech First League in the 1994–95 and 1995–96 seasons, scoring 15 and 22 goals respectively. In 1995, he won the Czech Footballer of the Year award. In 1996, he won the Personality of the League award at the Czech Footballer of the Year awards.

References

External links
 
 
 
 

1962 births
Living people
People from Hulín
Sportspeople from Olomouc
Czech footballers
Association football forwards
Czechoslovakia international footballers
Czech Republic international footballers
Dual internationalists (football)
UEFA Euro 1996 players
FK Hvězda Cheb players
SK Sigma Olomouc players
Chemnitzer FC players
VfB Oldenburg players
FC Linz players
FK Drnovice players
2. Bundesliga players
Czech First League players
Czech expatriate footballers
Expatriate footballers in Germany
Expatriate footballers in Austria